Ivanovo State University or IvSU is in Ivanovo, about 300 km east of Moscow, Russia. The university was founded in 1918; before 1974  it was called Ivanovo State Pedagogical Institute.

IvSU has accreditation and license from the Russian Ministry of Education. It is a member of Euroasian association of universities and Russian Association of Classical Universities, co-operates with educational institutions of Germany (Passau University and the Berlin Technical University), Sweden (University of Uppsala), Denmark (Aarhus University, Institute of Business and Technology in Herning) and China (Xiangtan University) among others. 

IvSU has different types of programs from traditional five years specialist degree to four years bachelor's degree and two years master's degree following the modernization of Russian education system and Bologna Process. Also, the university has 10 specialized councils that grant the degree of Kandidat Nauk as well as postgraduate degree of Doktor Nauk in the fields of history, technical science, linguistics, philosophy and economics.

History
Ivanovo State University was founded on 21 December 1918 as Ivanovo-Voznesensk Institute of National Education. On 12 July 1923 it was transformed into a teacher training college which in its turn served as a basis for creating a teacher training institute in August 1932. That institute was named after Dmitry Furmanov. In the 1960s programs aimed at training students from socialist countries began to be offered to international students. Ivanovo State University received its new name in 1974.

There was a separate Department of Russian as a Foreign Language established in 1982 in order to prepare international students to study in Russia. This university was the first in the region to offer degrees outside the Soviet system, offering degrees in economics in 1976, law in 1962, sociology in 1999, and applied programming in 1999.

Campus

IvSU has 9 academic buildings and three residence halls. The university has a library, sports facility, health centre, zoological and archaeological museums, the museum "Writers of Ivanovo Region", and a botanical garden and a vivarium.

Educational programmes

IvSU offers 23 Bachelor's degree programs, 17 Master's degree programs, ten PhD programs, and a specialist's degree in fundamental and applied chemistry.

International cooperation
IvSU has established partnerships with educational and scientific institutions in Bulgaria, Belarus, Vietnam, Germany, Italy, Kazakhstan, China, Poland, Romania, Serbia, Tajikistan, Finland, Czech Republic, Sweden, Uzbekistan, Denmark, China, and Uzbekistan.

The acting agreements give IvSU students and faculty an opportunity to improve their professional knowledge and language skills, to be more familiar with the cultures of various countries, and to gain experience of cross-cultural communication through exchange education, participation in languages, scientific internships, educational tours, and other forms of exchange education.

International activity
A number of foreign specialists have been trained at the Ivanovo State University since 1978. There are over 500 students who have come to the university from over 40 countries across Asia, Africa and Europe to study at the university. In addition to these countries, there are others like the Congo, China, Turkmenistan, Georgia, Germany, Vietnam, the Czech Republic, Guinea-Bissau, Nigeria, etc. Graduates of IvSU have gone on to work in a variety of countries throughout the world, including Germany, Vietnam, Holland, China, Canada, the United States, Mongolia, Cameroon, Syria, Angola, etc.

The following educational programmes are available to foreign students at IvSU:
 An additional educational programme that is designed to provide training and education to foreign citizens and stateless persons in order to enable them to master a professional educational programme in Russian (preparatory department).
 In addition, additional professional education is provided under the program "Russian as a Foreign Language" (professional retraining), which gives the right to teach Russian as a foreign language at an early stage, as well as to translate Russian.
 Additional training under the program "Russian as a Foreign Language" is provided in the form of coursework and internships, exchange education, and advanced training, namely "Methods of Teaching Russian as a Foreign Language."
 For foreign citizens, the main professional program is entitled "Russian language and culture in the modern world" (Master's degree).

Ivanovo State University offers foreign students a wide range of opportunities for developing their creative abilities and for enriching their cultural knowledge. At the annual interuniversity scientific and practical conference "A World without Borders", issues related to intercultural dialogue and interethnic tolerance will be discussed. There is an active participation of foreign students in this conference. There is a student organization named the "Welcome Center" within the framework of a federal project called "Your Route is Russia!" The residents of the center actively involve foreign students at IvSU in the activities they carry out. As part of International Student Day, IvSU takes an active part in a concert and exhibition devoted to the celebration of the day.

Career centre and Future Skills Preparation

A main objective of the center is to help undergraduate and graduate students at IvSU adapt to the present-day labor market and provide them with career guidance. There is also a center that helps high school graduates to choose a career path for the future.

About 95-97% of IvSU graduates are able to find employment within a half year of graduating from the university. It is estimated that around 70% of them are employed directly in the fields in which they majored. There are more than 30% of graduate students who are able to combine their studies with work successfully.

Student life
IvSU students take an active part in a number of all-Russian forums and workshops such as "Students' Russia", contests "Student of the Year" and "Univervision", all-Russian "Student Forum", "Territory of Meanings", "XXI century leader" workshops etc.
 
Student projects include:
 "Your Choice" –  a multilevel school for most active students;
 "Hello! You’re a student!" – a project aimed at first-year students;
 "Initiation to Studentship" – a contest/performance;
 "Hello, we’re looking for talented people!" a contest/performance;
 "The World without Borders" – an intercultural project;
 "Dance Week" – a dance contest;
 "Students' Spring" – a creativity contest;
 "MegaQR" – a photo quest, etc.

Scientific research
Ivanovo State University carries out fundamental and applied research in 19 scientific fields in the natural and engineering sciences, the humanities, and the social sciences. 

IvSU publishes a number of journals, including 'Liquid Crystals and Their Application', 'Woman in Russian Society', and 'Intelligentsia and the World'.

'Liquid Crystals and Their Application' is included in international citation databases Web of Science and Scopus. In 2017 the journal 'Woman in Russian Society' was also added to Scopus.

Sports

About 3,000 of students are engaged in physical education in the university. The University Sport Festivals, Freshman Sport Festival, university personal championships, Sport Fests, Health Days, Teachers and Staff Sports Festival, Family Festival, Skiing and Running Festivals are held annually.
Representative teams take part in the regional sport festivals among universities, the best athletes of the university participate in national and international competitions.

Sports clubs are available for students interested in aerobics, badminton, basketball, football, gymnastics, kayaking, kickboxing, powerlifting, sambo, skiing, table tennis, volleyball, and wushu.

Notable personalities

Staff 

 Aleksandr Khinchin
 Nikolai Luzin
 Anatoly Maltsev

Alumni 

 Mikhail Dudin
 Igor Zhukov

References

External links

 

Universities in Ivanovo Oblast
Educational institutions established in 1918
Ivanovo
1918 establishments in Russia
Cultural heritage monuments in Ivanovo Oblast